My Suitor is an 8-track EP or mini-album of covers from Japanese pop star Kahimi Karie. The original songs were largely recorded by little-known UK artists in the 1980s including Dolly Mixture and the Lilac Time. It was released in Japan in 2002 by the Polydor label. The disc was packaged with a bonus track, "Warrior in Wordsworth" and the music video for "Melt the Snow".

Track listing
(Track 8 is a "hidden" or bonus track on the original pressing only)

 "My Suitor" (Bernthøler) –
 "Dilly Dally Dolly" (Dolly Mixture) –
 "Melt the Snow" (Virginia Astley)–
 "Drumbeat for Baby" (Weekend) –
 "Black Velvet" (The Lilac Time) –
 "Since You've Been Away" (The French Impressionists) –
 "The Photo Song" (Holger Czukay) –
 "Warrior in Wordsworth" (X-Ray Spex) –

References

Kahimi Karie albums
2002 EPs
Polydor Records EPs
Covers EPs